Artiom "Tommy" Arshansky (born 26 September 1991) is an Israeli judoka. He competes in the extra lightweight (under 60 kg) weight category. He represented Israel at the 2012 Summer Olympics and won a bronze medal at the 2013 European Judo Championships.

Arshansky was born in Moscow and after his family made aliyah lived in Tirat Carmel, Haifa and Kiryat Yam.

References

External links

 
 
 
 

1991 births
Living people
Israeli Jews
Israeli male judoka
Russian Jews
Russian male judoka
Russian emigrants to Israel
Olympic judoka of Israel
Judoka at the 2012 Summer Olympics
Judoka at the 2015 European Games
European Games competitors for Israel